The Menora Tunnel or Meru-Menora Tunnel is a highway tunnel in Perak, Malaysia. It is an 800-metre tunnel on the North–South Expressway Northern Route near Jelapang. It runs underneath the Keledang Range.

The Menora tunnel was opened officially in 1986. There are two tunnels side by side for each direction.  The tunnel is a frequent site of accidents.

References

Buildings and structures in Perak
Road tunnels in Malaysia
Transport in Perak
Tunnels completed in 1986